The Bilsdale transmitting station is a broadcasting and telecommunications facility, located at Bilsdale West Moor above Bilsdale, close to Helmsley, North Yorkshire, England. The original facility included a guyed steel tubular mast that was primarily used for radio and television transmission. Until a fire disabled the transmitter on 10 August 2021 it was among the most powerful transmitters in the UK. The power for analogue was 500 kW ERP and it was 100 kW / 50 kW for digital. The mast was equipped with aircraft warning lights, in the form of arrays of red LEDs. 
The station was owned and operated by Arqiva.  The transmitting station now has a temporary  mast located close to the original mast. It commenced operations on 13 October 2021.

History

Original mast (1969–2021) 
Bilsdale was constructed by J. L. Eve Construction for the BBC in 1969 to bring 625-line colour television on UHF to Teesside and the surrounding areas for the first time. Having added UHF TV to the existing VHF TV stations at Pontop Pike and Emley Moor, it was quickly established that a new station would be required to cover County Durham and north North Yorkshire where existing coverage was poor, and thus the new station was built.

Fire and demolition 
On 10 August 2021, a fire started at the complex which included the mast. At 13:19 an engineer working at the transmitter called the North Yorkshire Fire and Rescue Service stating that he believed the mast was on fire and could see smoke coming from below the first stay level  from the ground. It was reported that up to one million homes had lost TV and radio signals. Concerns remained about the structural integrity of the mast, which now needed to have a structural engineering assessment. Arqiva confirmed that they were working on restoring service using a combination of temporary structures and existing infrastructure around the region, but were unable to provide a timescale for this. Viewers in the Hartlepool and Redcar and the eastern edges of Middlesbrough were able to receive their television services from the Eston Nab transmitting station. The frequencies of the Eston Nab relay were altered to match the frequencies of the out-of-service Bilsdale frequencies for the PSB services, and COM TV services are provided by a temporary mast to the same area, using Eston Nab’s frequencies. On 19 August, transmitter operator Arqiva announced that an increase in power would enable 250,000 households in the area to receive a signal from the Eston Nab transmitter. On 6 October 2021, Arqiva carried out a controlled demolition of the old mast, as the structure was found to be irreparably damaged. Sections of the mast have been retained for investigation purposes.

Temporary mast (2021–) 
Following the destruction of the first mast, Arqiva constructed a temporary mast in a nearby former quarry site.

Replacement 

A new mast of similar height and capability to the old one has been built on the site. The replacement mast was completed in February 2023. At March 2023 the new mast had still not been fully commissioned and the small temporary mast on site remains operational.

Coverage
Coverage extends throughout Teesside and the surrounding regions, encompassing north North Yorkshire and southern County Durham. This included Harrogate and York to the south, Filey and Whitby to the east, Middlesbrough, Stockton, Darlington, Bishop Auckland, Hartlepool, Peterlee, some areas of Seaham and some areas of Sunderland to the north, and Barnard Castle and Worton to the west.

Channels listed by frequency

Analogue radio

Digital radio

Digital television
In July 2007, it was confirmed by Ofcom that the television frequency assignment after digital switchover would be such that a wideband or group K aerial would be required for reception of all six multiplexes. However, the three public service multiplexes would still fall within the station's original analogue frequency range assignment of aerial group A. The digital switchover started at Bilsdale on 12 September 2012 and was one of the last transmitters in England to complete this operation on 26 September 2012, the others being Pontop Pike and Chatton in the same region.

On 13 November 2019, due to the 700 MHz Clearance Programme, the following multiplexes moved frequencies:

 BBC A from UHF 26 to UHF 21.
 Digital 3&4 from UHF 29 to UHF 24.
 BBC B from UHF 23 to UHF 27.
 Arqiva C and D moving to UHF 55 and UHF 56 respectively.

On 12 March, BBC A and BBC B swap UHF Channel allocations, with BBC A on UHF 27 and BBC B on UHF 21.

On 25 June 2020, COM 8 was switched off permanently due to the effects of the 700 MHz clearance programme.

All broadcasting from Bilsdale temporarily ceased on 10 August 2021 due to damage to the mast by fire.

Before switchover

Analogue television
Analogue television is no longer available from Bilsdale; BBC2 was closed on 12 September 2012, followed by the remaining four channels on 26 September 2012.

Relays
Below is a list of transmitters that relayed Bilsdale.

Digital television

See also
 List of masts
 List of tallest buildings and structures in Great Britain
 List of radio stations in the United Kingdom

References

External links

 Bilsdale transmitter on MB21
 Info and picture of Bilsdale transmitter including co-receivable transmitters.
 Bilsdale Transmitter at thebigtower.com

Buildings and structures in North Yorkshire
Hambleton District
Mass media in Yorkshire
Transmitter sites in England